Theodosius II was the eastern Roman emperor from 402 until 450.

Theodosius II or Theodosios II may also refer to:

Theodosius II of Abkhazia, king 828–855
Theodosius II of Alexandria, patriarch 12th century
Theodosius II of Constantinople, patriarch 1769–1773

See also
 Theodosius (disambiguation), a given name, including a list of people with that name